The angular pebblesnail, scientific name Somatogyrus biangulatus,  is a species of very small freshwater snail with an operculum, an aquatic operculate gastropod mollusk in the Hydrobiidae family. This species is endemic to the United States.  Its natural habitat is rivers.
This snail is only located in specific freshwater cave environments and has not been extensively studied.

References

Molluscs of the United States
Somatogyrus
Gastropods described in 1906
Taxonomy articles created by Polbot